Delniţa River may refer to the following rivers in Romania:

 Delnița River (Moldova) - tributary of the Moldova River
 Delnița - tributary of the Olt in Harghita County
 Delnița River (Sulța) - tributary of the Sulța River

See also 
 Delnița (disambiguation)